Anil Shirole, alias Padmakar Gulabrao Shirole, (born 13 September 1950), hails from the Shiledar Shirole (Patil) family. He represented Pune constituency in the 16th Lok Sabha from 2014 to 2019. He was previously a member of Pune's municipal council. He completed his graduation in BA from University of Pune.

Career
Anil Shirole was first elected to Pune Municipal Corporation as a BJP candidate in 1992. He was re-elected for a second term from 1997 to 2002, having been appointed leader of the BJP party in Pune in 2000.

Timeline

 1970 - President- Patit Pavan Sanghatna (Pune City)
 1972 - Secretary- RSS Student Wings
 1975 - Imprisoned for 1 year during Emergency under the Maintenance of Internal Security Act
 1992 - Elected as BJP corporator for Pune Municipal Corporation
 1997 - Re-elected and appointed member of PMC Standing Committee
 2000 - President- Bharatiya Janata Party, Pune City
 2002 - Leader of Opposition/Highest ever BJP corporator tally
 2013 - President- 2nd term as Bharatiya Janata Party, Pune City
 2014 - Elected in Pune as Member of Parliament for 16th lower house of Government of India on the ticket of Bhartiya Janata Party.

References

External links
 
 
 http://www.sakaaltimes.com/NewsDetails.aspx?NewsId=5547439356034105217&SectionId=5494605966908300850&SectionName=Civic&NewsDate=20131108&*NewsTitle=BJP%20names%20%20city%20executive%20committee
 http://archive.mid-day.com/lifestyle/2013/jun/110613-anil-shirole-elected-city-bjp-president.htm

1950 births
Living people
Politicians from Pune
Savitribai Phule Pune University alumni
India MPs 2014–2019
Lok Sabha members from Maharashtra
Bharatiya Janata Party politicians from Maharashtra
Marathi politicians
Maharashtra municipal councillors